This is a list of countries with Subway restaurants.

Africa

Asia

Europe

North America

Oceania

South America

References

Subway (restaurant)
Subway
Subway